Human's Lib is the debut album by the British pop musician Howard Jones. It was released in March 1984 and entered the UK Albums Chart at the no. 1 spot, spending a total of 57 weeks in the charts. The album has been certified double platinum by the BPI for sales in excess of 600,000 copies.

Four songs from this album were released as singles in the UK, all of which reached the top 20: "New Song" peaked at #3, "What Is Love?" at #2, "Hide and Seek" at #12, and "Pearl in the Shell" at #7. "New Song" and "What Is Love?" also made it into the Billboard charts in the US, both reaching the top 40.

"Equality" was released as a single only in South Africa, as a commentary about the policy of apartheid there at the time.

Reception

Reviews of Human's Lib were generally negative, with many criticising the songs' music and lyrics as being lightweight. In Melody Maker, Colin Irwin called Jones "the aural equivalent of painting by numbers" and that although the sentiments expressed in the lyrics were worthy ones, "his sermons are embarrassingly glib". Irwin stated that only "Hide and Seek" and the title track were passable songs, and that overall "this is very shallow pop music dressed as something much more important and profound". Don Watson of NME wrote, "It's as hard to distinguish his music as it is to distinguish it from your carpet; conveniently, though, the lyrics are printed on the inner sleeve so that we may fully appreciate the complete lack of any novel observation in the songs ... What's so amusing about Jones' songwriting is the glib manner in which he brandishes threadbare platitudes as unique insights." In Sounds, Tibet called Human's Lib "an LP of simple/simplistic electronic-pop tunes, irretrievably lightweight, that offer nothing new except more music to tap your feet and grin inanely to". He stated that it was "not an offensive record at all", but that "people should ask for something more demanding than aural air conditioning".

In the US, Christopher Connelly of Rolling Stone stated that Jones "simply doesn't demonstrate the imagination or songwriting skill to produce anything truly memorable", and that "too often, his compositions are poor pastiches of already overworked synth exercises". Robert Christgau of The Village Voice panned Human's Lib as a "revolving self-help manual" marred by Jones' "ressentiment" and unadorned synth-pop. 

More positive reviews came from Betty Page in Record Mirror, who said the album provided "lashings of beaty, intensely danceable chunks of electropop alternated with sincere and heartfelt one-man-and-his-piano ballads. And to a point, he does it very well ... for an occupier of the Middle Earth of chart pop, he's quite a grower, if not a wrencher of guts", and from Neil Tennant in Smash Hits, who commented that Jones had "a neat talent for writing melodic pop songs with clever hooks and real 1970s singer-songwriter lyrics. A must for all Supertramp fans." 

Mike DeGagne of AllMusic was more favourable in a retrospective review and stated that Human's Lib "is fueled by the nonstop synth-pop hooks and brightly textured melodies that went on to be a trademark of Howard Jones".

Track listing
All tracks composed by Howard Jones unless indicated otherwise. Track timings are taken from the original UK LP edition.

Many CD editions substitute a 6:32 mix of "What Is Love?" (identical to the extended mix from the 12-inch single except that the vocal echo at 2:52 is missing) for the 3:45 album version and add "China Dance", an instrumental B-side from the "Hide & Seek" single, as a bonus track (track 11).

Personnel
Howard Jones – synthesizers, keyboards, vocals, drum machines
Davey Payne – saxophone on "Pearl in the Shell"
Stephen W. Tayler – engineer, mixing; saxophone on "Pearl in the Shell"
Ben Rogan – assistant engineer
Colin Thurston – producer and engineer on "New Song"
Rupert Hine – producer on all other tracks
Stuart Fowler – photography
Steg – artwork

Equipment used
Howard Jones used the following equipment on Human's Lib:
Roland Jupiter-8
Roland Juno-60
Yamaha DX7 (x2)
Sequential Circuits Pro-One
Sequential Circuits Prophet T8 - MIDI'd to two DX7's
Moog Prodigy
Roland TR-808 drum machine
E-mu Drumulator drum machine
Simmons SDS-V drum module /w SDS-6 sequencer
LinnDrum - Rupert Hine's

Various drum sounds replaced with real drum samples from an AMS digital delay.

Charts

Weekly charts

Year-end charts

Certifications

References

Howard Jones (English musician) albums
Albums produced by Colin Thurston
Albums produced by Rupert Hine
Elektra Records albums
Warner Music Group albums
1984 debut albums